The fourth series of Gladiators aired in the UK from 16 September to 23 December 1995.

Gladiators

Episodes

 Saracen’s mistimed tackle on Phil during Powerball injured his elbow, forcing him to retire from the event. Rhino was the replacement gladiator.
 Rhino's high tackle on Michael during Powerball caused him to break his knee and he was forced to retire before the first event was over. Mike Reynaud was the substitute contender.
 The game was concluded and the score did stand but John Anderson had something to introduce to Wolf. Wolf received his first ever red card in his career.
 Nightshade picked up a concussion in Tilt after beating Jenny in the first pull, forcing her to retire from the event. Falcon was the replacement gladiator.
 Raider was ejected for retaliation on Lawrence. He was eventually suspended for one episode and fined.

References

1995 British television seasons
series four